Ingebrigt Haldorsen Sæter (24 June 1800 – 3 May 1875) was a Norwegian politician and farmer with connection to the peasant opposition and the democracy movement. He was Member of The Norwegian Parliament for 40 years with disruption of parliamentary sessions 1859–60 and 1862–63, as he was deputy representative.

Biography

Youth
Sæter was born in Oppdal. 
He grew up in a haugiansk influenced environment at the farm Bøasæter in Oppdal and went to a moving school (moving from place to place at random intervals), which offered limited learning. The parish priest Cornelius Thomas Rønnau, was a source of salvation. He made a great contribution towards education, training and rural development, and ensured that children received additional training. For Sæter this meant access to a Public library which was important.

Political career
He was elected to the Norwegian Parliament in 1833, 1836, 1839, 1842, 1845, 1848, 1851, 1854, 1857, 1865, 1868 and 1871, representing the rural constituency of Søndre Trondhjems Amt (today named Sør-Trøndelag). He was also a deputy representative around 1860. Working as a farmer, he was known as a prominent liberal.

References

1800 births
1875 deaths
Members of the Storting
Sør-Trøndelag politicians
Norwegian farmers
People from Oppdal